This is a '''list of universities in Seychelles.

Universities in Seychelles
Seychelles Polytechnic
University of Seychelles
Atlantic African Oriental Multicultural (ATAFOM) University

References

Education in Seychelles
Seychelles
Universities
Seychelles